"Crucified" is a song by Swedish band Army of Lovers, released as the first single from their second album, Massive Luxury Overdose (1991), and the seventh single to be released by the band. It was released in May 1991 (in Sweden), February–April 1992 (in the UK and US), and July 2013 ("Crucified 2013"). The song was written by bandmembers Alexander Bard and Jean-Pierre Barda with Anders Wollbeck, and features Barda (vocals, drums), Bard (vocals, computer) and La Camilla (vocals, bass). It was successful in several European countries, including Belgium, where it reached the number-one, and Germany, Sweden, Austria and Switzerland, where it reached the top 10. In the United States, "Crucified" became a huge club hit and radio favorite, debuting at number six on the Billboard Dance singles chart and spending a total of 14 weeks in the top 20. The initial remixes available on the CD maxi and vinyl 12" maxi are by Nuzak. The track samples the drum break from James Brown's Funky Drummer.

In 2013, Army of Lovers made a new version of the song, simply called "Crucified 2013". It contained new vocals from Camilla Henemark, and then a second version with new vocals from Dominika Peczynski was issued.

Kurt Cobain of the hugely successful alternative rock group Nirvana praised the band in his posthumously published journals, specifically the song "Crucified."

Chart performance
"Crucified" became very successful on the charts in Europe and the US, peaking at number-one in Belgium, and number two in Greece and the Netherlands. The song remains to date one of the bands biggest hits, entering the top 10 also in Austria (3), Germany (5), Spain (8), Sweden (8) and Switzerland (6) in 1991. In the United Kingdom, the single peaked at number 31 on the UK Singles Chart on February 23, 1992, after having reached number 47 the year before. On the Eurochart Hot 100, "Crucified" peaked at number 14 in March 1992. Outside Europe, it enjoyed success in the US, peaking at number six on both the Billboard Dance Club Songs chart and the Billboard Dance/Electronic Singles Sales chart. 

In 2014, the single again charted in the US, reaching number 18 and 45 on the Billboard Dance Club Songs chart and the Billboard Dance/Electronic Songs chart.

Critical reception
AllMusic editor Ned Raggett described the song as a "totally over-the-top disco anthem on all fronts that takes ABBA's winning combination of memorable hooks and harmonies as inspiration and slathers a load of glitter and make-up over the whole thing." He noted further that "having ultracampy lyrical asides like "I cry, I pray, mon dieu" doesn't hurt the sheer giddiness at work, and neither do the "I'm crucified like my saviour" chorus, church organ and twangy Duane Eddy guitar." David A. Keeps from Austin American Statesman felt songs like "Crucified" "are steeped in romantic and biblical imagery that suggests, in a typically broad camp stroke, that obsessive love is the most religious experience of all." Larry Flick from Billboard complimented it as a "super-hot slammin' houser". Bevan Hannah from The Canberra Times wrote, "Judging by the video for their first single release "Crucified", their image was carefully plotted, combining cabaret style costumes and graphics with groovy European dance rhythms." A reviever from Music Week viewed the song as "a bizarre pop/dance confection, both commercial and camp." Newcastle Evening Chronicle called it a "clever almost choral rock approach on a lively danceable number", noting its "ebullient bounce". 

A reviewer from People Magazine said that "disco goes to church in this hip-hop hallelujah". James Hamilton from the RM Dance Update commented that it's "camp and corny party fun from Sweden, this Abba-ishly chorused, phonetic guy rapped, strings swirled and — just to cap it all! — Duane Eddy-ish guitar twanged 0-122bpm jiggly jumper sounds like a pop hit with wide gimmick appeal". Sophie Lawrence reviewed the song for Smash Hits, writing, "It's one of those records where you can imagine everyone at a disco dancing around with their hands in the air, isn't it? I like it. It's got a gospel feel and really good harmonies on it." Edna Gundersen from USA Today said, "Watch for Army of Lovers to succeed Right Said Fred as the newest camp sensation to hop the pond. The Stockholm trio's loopy, trashy Eurodisco single, "Crucified", is the best but by no means the only infectious groove on their Massive Luxury Overdose album." Joe Brown from The Washington Post found that "the Army reveals a lyrical obsession with a millenarian-apocalyptic- sacrilege thang, and La Camilla's kitschy cooing includes imitations of Grace Jones and Debbie Harry."

Music video
A music video was produced to promote the single. It was directed by Swedish directors Fredrik Boklund and Martin Persson, and filmed at Börringe Priory, a castle in Svedala, Sweden, that was built in 1763 on the ruins of a medieval Benedictine priory. In one scene, the band is seen parading past a potrait of Carl XVI Gustaf. The video was one of the most played on MTV Europe in the fall of 1991. It was later published on YouTube by Vevo in May 2016, and had generated more than 14 million views as of February 2023.

Usage in media and cover versions
The music video of "Crucified" was used in an episode of American animated television series Beavis and Butt-Head.

The song was played in Gabriel Aghion's 1996 film, Pédale douce, and was thus included in the track listing of the soundtrack. It was also played in the film Marock (2005), and was in the video game Just Dance 4 on the Wii.

Alexander Bard's music project, Gravitonas used a sample of the song on the track "Sacrifice" from their 2012 Black Ceremony EP.

The song was covered by the Swedish band Ghost in their extended play titled If You have Ghost.

In 2021, Azerbaijani singer Efendi sampled the first few seconds of Crucified for her track "Mata Hari", which would represent Azerbaijan in Eurovision 2021.

Formats and track listings

 7" single (1991 & 1992)
"Crucified" - 3:32
"Love Revolution" - 4:02

 12" maxi-single (1991)
"Crucified" (The Nuzak Remix) - 8:03
"Crucified" (Yherushalaim Dub) - 7:42
"Crucified" (Radio Edit) - 3:32

 CD single (1991)
"Crucified" (Radio Edit) - 3:32
"Crucified" (The Nuzak Remix) - 8:03
"Crucified" (Yherushalaim Dub) - 7:42

 12" maxi-single (UK, 1992)
"Crucified" (The Nuzak Mix) - 8:03
"Crucified" (Crucifixion Hardcore '92 Mix) - 5:06
"Crucified" (The Maffia Mix) - 5:53

 12" maxi-single (US, 1992)
"Crucified" (Judas Mix) - 6:47
"Crucified" (Judas Mix Instrumental) - 6:38
"Crucified" (Judas Mix Dubstrumental) - 4:19
"Crucified" (Teknostalgia Mix) - 4:14
"Ride the Bullet" (The DNA Remix) - 4:54
"Ride the Bullet" (The DNA Remix Dub) - 5:42
"Crucified" (Yherushalaim Dub) - 7:40
"Crucified" (Crucifixion Mix) - 5:09

 CD single (UK, 1992)
"Crucified" (Radio Edit) - 3:32
"Crucified" (Crucifixion Hardcore '92 Mix) - 5:06
"Crucified" (The Maffia Mix) - 5:53
"Crucified" (The Nuzak Mix) 8:03

 CD maxi (US, 1992)
"Crucified" (Single Version) - 3:31
"Crucified" (Nuzak Remix) - 8:00
"Crucified" (Judas Mix) - 6:47
"Crucified" (Judas Mix Dubstramental) - 4:19
"Crucified" (Teknostradamus Mix) - 6:36
"Crucified" (Teknostalgia Mix) - 4:14
"Crucified" (Crucifixion Mix) 5:09
"Ride the Bullet" (The DNA Remix) - 4:54
"Ride the Bullet" (Molotov Cocktail Mix) - 4:58
"Ride the Bullet" (Tren De Amor Mix) - 6:24

 Digital-download (2013)
"Crucified 2013" (Radio Edit) - 3:15
"Crucified 2013" (Sound Factory Radio) - 3:29
"Crucified 2013" (Per QX + Sonny Switch Radio) - 3:00
"Crucified 2013" (NORD Radio Edit) - 3:31
"Crucified 2013" (Extended Version) - 5:54
"Crucified 2013" (Sound Factory Paradise Anthem) - 8:32
"Crucified 2013" (Per QX + Sonny Switch Club Mix) - 5:49
"Crucified 2013" (NORD Club Mix) - 5:54
"Crucified 2013" (Sound Factory Dark Dub) - 8:25

Credits and personnel

 Produced by: Alexander Bard and Anders Wollbeck
 Co-produced and engineered by: Per Adebratt
 Recorded and mixed at: Sonct Studios, Stockholm
 Lead vocals by: Jean-Pierre Barda and Dominika Peczynski (2013)
 Backing vocals by: Katarina Wilczewski, Erika Essen-Möller, Malin Bäckström, Jean-Paul Wall and Rickard Evenlind
 Keyboards and programming by: Anders Wollbeck. Katarina Wilczewski appears courtesy of Caprice Records. Jean-Paul Wall and Richard Evenlind appear courtesy of Sonet Grammofon. Anders Wollbeck appears courtesy of Sunrise Records.

 Executive producer: Ola Håkansson
 Sleeve design by: Marie S-Wollback
 Photography by: Carl-Johan Paulin
 Stylist: Camilla Thulin
 Hair and make-up by: Jean-Pierre Barda
 Promotion supervisor: Jonas Holst
 Video clip directed by: Fredrik Boklund  and Martin Persson
 Management: La La La Entreprises

Charts

Weekly charts

Year-end charts

References

1991 singles
1992 singles
Army of Lovers songs
Techno songs
Ultratop 50 Singles (Flanders) number-one singles
Songs written by Anders Wollbeck
Songs written by Alexander Bard
1991 songs
Stockholm Records singles
Music videos directed by Fredrik Boklund

Songs critical of religion
English-language Swedish songs